This list comprises all players who have participated in at least one league match for Toronto Lynx in the USL since the league began keeping detailed records in 2003. Players who were on the roster but never played a first team game are not listed; players who appeared for the team in other competitions (Open Canada Cup, etc.) but never actually made an USL appearance are noted at the bottom of the page where appropriate.

A "*" denotes players who are known to have appeared for the team prior to 2003.

A
  Mohamed Aborig
  Laryea Adjetey
  Oswald Adu
  Said Ali
  Cameron Alksnis
  Eric Amato
  Andre Andrade
  Nikola Andrijevic
  Ryan Anstey
  Andres Arango
  Robbie Aristodemo
  Richard Asante
  Brian Ashton
  Steven Axe

B
  Anthony Bahadur
  Chris Baker
  Sebastian Barclay
  Lloyd Barker*
  Edgar Bartolomeu
  Darren Baxter
  Marko Bedenikovic
  Wyn Belotte
  Nils Binstock
  Nick Blicharski
  Lewis Blois
  Derek Boakye-Yiadom
  Toba Bolaji
  Chris Broadfoot
  Vinicius Brito
  Gregory Brooks
  Nikola Budalić
  Adrian Butters

C
  Robert Cavicchia
  Gordon Chin
  Alvin Chung*
  Matthew Connor
  Jonathan Costa

D
  Edmilson De Carvalho
  Sergio De Luca
  Chris DeAbreu
  Niels Dekker
  Dwayne De Rosario*
  Andrew Derayeh
  Erik Di Lorenzo
  David Diplacido
  Jamie Dodds
  Francisco Dos Santos

E
  Huffman Eja-Tabe
  Sherif El-Masri
  Yuri Elkaim

F
  Jamie Fairweather
  Shawn Faria
  Stephen Fattore
  Matt Felice
  Elton Fernandes
  Abraham Francois
  Sean Fraser

G
  Ryan Gamble
  Ivan Gascon
  Branko Gavric
  Charles Gbeke
  Ali Gerba
  Richard Goddard
  Domingos Gomes
  Elder Gomes
  Gong Lei
  Winston Griffiths
  Lloyd Grist

H
  Erik Hakim
  Bryheem Hancock
  Chris Handsor
  Roman Harapyn
  Robin Hart
  Brandon Heembrock
  Nigel Henry
  Lyndon Hooper
  Tyler Hughes
  Atiba Hutchinson*

J
  Al James
  Kayin Jeffers
  Kevin Jeffrey
  Danley Johnson
  Frank Jonke
  John Jonke
  Ivan Jurisic

K
  Milan Kojic
  Jimmy Kuzmanovski

L
  Kadian Lecky
  Greg Lewandowski
  Paul Lewis
  Christian Lombardo
  Maximir Luburic
  Ryan Lucas
  Michael Luk

M
  Chris Marshall
  Sita-Taty Matondo
  Joe Mattacchione
  Josue Mayard
  Chris McBride
  Konner McNamara
  Mikael McNamara
  Cameron Medwin
  Adolfo Mella
  Tony Menezes
  Gregory Messam
  Nikola Miodrag
  Bart Misiak
  Chris Mitchell
  Paul Munster*
  Rumbani Munthali
  Tristan Murray

N
  Osni Neto
  Danny Nguyen
  John Barry Nusum

O
  Matthew O'Connor
  Giuliano Oliviero
  Kevin Omokhua
  Pat Onstad
  Dominic Oppong
  Marco Oliveira

P
  Matthew Palleschi
  Jure Pavic
  Helio Pereira
  Vince Petrasso
  Jeremie Piette
  Antonín Plachý
  Damien Pottinger
  Chris Pozniak*
  Igor Prostran

R
  Tomasz Radzinski*
  Julian Ramjohn
  Marco Reda*
  Daniel Revivo
  Scott Rietze
  Derek Rios
  Lukas Risto
  Dane Roberts
  Brad Rose
  Brian Rowland
  Kurt Alex Ruhe-Lischke

S
  Fabrizio Savarino
  Damion Scott
  Adrian Serioux
  Jeremy Shepherd
  Matthew Silva
  Chris Simm
  Dave Simpson
  Bayete Smith
  Conrad Smith
  Jelani Smith
  Matthew Smith
  Terence Smith
  Lee Smyth
  Urbain Some
  Stephen Soutar
  Paul Stalteri
  Luke Stedmond
  Aaron Steele
  Josh Stephens

T
  Desmond Tachie
  Jordan Taylor
  Elvis Thomas
  Rick Titus
  Jean Tshimpaka

V
  Jan Veenhof
  Nikola Vignjević
  Mauricio Vincello
  Christian Valentine

W
  Jordan Webb
  Jonathan Westmaas
  Mackenzie Wilde
  Chris Williams
  Murphy Wiredu

Z
  Theo Zagar

Sources

 2010 Toronto Lynx stats
 2009 Toronto Lynx stats
 2008 Toronto Lynx stats
 2007 Toronto Lynx stats
 2006 Toronto Lynx stats
 2005 Toronto Lynx stats
 2004 Toronto Lynx stats

References

Toronto Lynx
 
Association football player non-biographical articles